Nebria rubripes rubripes is a subspecies of ground beetle in the  Nebriinae subfamily that is endemic to France.

References

rubripes rubripes
Beetles described in 1821
Endemic beetles of Metropolitan France